Penpal is a 2012 self-published horror/thriller creepypasta novel and the debut novel of the American author Dathan Auerbach. The work was first published in paperback on July 11, 2012 through 1000Vultures and is based on a series of popular creepypasta stories that Auerbach posted to Reddit. The stories were adapted for The NoSleep Podcast's debut season in 2011 and narrated by Sammy Raynor.

The book follows the narrator as he finds himself the focus of an obsessed stalker who tracks him throughout his childhood. Film rights to Penpal were optioned by producer Rich Middlemas in 2012.

Plot
Penpal is told via a series of non-linear recollections by an anonymous narrator trying to make sense of mysterious events that happened to him during his childhood, the truth of which have been kept from him by his mother all his life.

As a boy in kindergarten, the narrator becomes best friends with another student named Josh. One day, their class conducts a penpal experiment, in which the children tie self-addressed letters to balloons and send them off; as the children receive responses, their teacher tracks how far their balloons went on a state map in the classroom. While most of the children get letters back, the narrator starts to believe his balloon got lost, until he receives an envelope containing a single poorly shot Polaroid photo. Over the school-year, he will receive over 50 other pictures, all without any letter. Soon after, he realizes that the pictures are all of himself and his mother, which prompts her to call the police.

The narrator recalls a series of disconnected events which, while innocuous to him as a child, take on sinister new meaning from an adult perspective: a neighborhood snowcone customer once returned the same dollar bill to the narrator he'd included in his initial penpal letter; while out playing in a ditch with Josh, the narrator became aware of strange clicking noises he later identified as camera flashes; the narrator once found a strange drawing in a pair of shorts he'd left by the riverside containing a depiction of himself aside a much larger man; one of the narrator's elderly, Alzheimer's-stricken neighbors was presumably murdered shortly after claiming her long-dead husband had returned home and was living with her again. In an incident that particularly stands out in the narrator's memory, he recalls awakening in the woods one night in his pajamas and finding his way back home to discover the police looking for him; he later discovered a letter on his bed stating his intentions to run away, although the narrator notes that his name was misspelled. Shortly after this incident, the narrator's mother discovers something in the house's crawlspace that prompts her to sell the home and move.

Shortly after the "sleepwalking" incident, the narrator's cat, Boxes, disappears, prompting the narrator and Josh to sneak back to the narrator's old house at night to look for it; there, they discover cat food and an adult man's clothing inside the crawlspace, as well as a shrine consisting of multiple Polaroids in the narrator's room. Pursued by an unseen individual who took his picture during the chase, Josh drops the walkie talkie he and the narrator had been using to keep in touch; later that night, the narrator hears Boxes' mewing coming from his own walkie talkie.

Josh attends the narrator's 12th birthday party but seems troubled and says he thinks he's been sleepwalking; the narrator notes that this was the last time he ever saw Josh.

Years pass and the narrator – now a teenager – meets and begins dating Veronica, Josh's older sister, who is reluctant to talk about her brother. One night, on a date to the movie theater, Veronica is the victim of a hit and run in a movie theater parking lot, although the narrator does not see the vehicle. He still suspects the driver to be the person who followed him on the way to the date. In the hospital, Veronica admits to the narrator that Josh has been missing for years after his disappeared one night, leaving a note on his pillow saying he was running away. During Veronica's recovery in the hospital, the pair begin texting and their relationship intensifies, culminating in Veronica telling the narrator she loves him. He later learns that Veronica has been dead for weeks and that her phone was never recovered after the narrator gave it back to her following the accident.

Now an adult, the narrator confronts his long-estranged mother about these incidents. The narrator's mother confesses that shortly after Veronica's death, Josh's father – a construction worker – was approached by a man who paid him cash to fill in a series of holes in his backyard. A month later, while he was landscaping the same property, Josh's father unearthed a coffin containing the bodies of Josh and a large, adult man holding him in his embrace. Calling the narrator's mother to the scene, Josh's father identified the man as the same individual who'd paid him to fill the holes, and realizes that he was responsible for abducting Josh and arranging for them to be buried alive together; the narrator's mother confesses that Josh was wearing a set of the narrator's missing clothes. The pair agree to keep what's happened a secret and Josh's father sets fire to the corpse of the man, refusing that his son rest with the stranger in death.

The narrator reconciles with his mother, thanking her for revealing what happened. He confesses he'll never know why the Penpal kidnapped Josh instead of him, but supposes the man couldn't go with his plan to kidnap him and focused his attention on Josh, as the two friends looked very much alike. Suffering from survivor's guilt, the narrator wishes he had never met Josh so that he could still be alive, and admits that – believing there is no afterlife – he does not think the Penpal will ever face punishment for his crimes. The narrator concludes saying he loves Josh and cherishes all of the memories he had of them when they were young.

Background

The story line for Penpal is based on a series of stories that Auerbach posted to the subreddit "No Sleep" under the username 1000Vultures. Auerbach posted the first story, "Footsteps", to r/nosleep in September 2011, where it received a large positive response. He had initially meant for "Footsteps" to be a standalone story, but Auerbach chose to continue writing more stories following the same protagonist due to reader demand. Each story was narrated by the same protagonist and each one opened with the same format, where the protagonist responded to a question posted by one of the readers. During this time Auerbach also responded to user posts while in character as the protagonist. Auerbach continued to post more stories and eventually chose to expand the Reddit stories into a full length novel.

To finance the book's publication Auerbach chose to raise funds via a Kickstarter campaign, which raised $15,946. He then published the book under his own imprint, 1000Vultures, after his Reddit username.

In an interview with Auerbach, he explained how he came up with the original idea for the short story "Footsteps", which would later be tuned into the full novel Penpal. He stated that it came from a childhood memory: "My mom denies that this ever happened, but as a kid I distinctly remember waking up on my porch outside, cold and in my underwear. My mom insists that it couldn't have possibly happened, so I guess I'll never know. But I've carried that memory around for years." He also explained how the fear of someone scooping him up in broad daylight and taking him away from his parents was always a prominent worry he had growing up, and one that would constantly manifest itself into his nightmares. He described how these experiences, mixed with the idea that "people can't perfectly remember everything from their childhood", served as "the impetus for 'Footsteps'." From here, his stories were woven together, creating a main character thrust into the very situations that the author feared himself.

Reception
SF Signal rated Penpal at four stars and wrote "Auerbach took something with childish innocence and twisted into a haunting tale of obsession. I look forward watching Auerbach improve with future works that are bound to give me nightmares."

The novel was greatly received by critics as well as fans. Because so many people had followed the individually released stories that Penpal contains for so long on creepypasta.com, Auerbach was able to open a Kickstarter to raise money to get the book independently published. Auerbach explains in an interview held by Horrornovelreviews.com that the reason he believes his novel was so well-received from horror fans was because the idea of a stalker hunting you down is such a raw and human fear. Because there is nothing supernatural or fantastical about the situation, it becomes very real and readers are able to sympathize with the main character that much more. He states that "If the initial success of 'Footsteps' had gone unnoticed, I probably would not have continued writing the rest of the stories to continue it."

References

Further reading
Auerbach, Dathan: Bad Man. Doubleday, 2018.

External links
The 50 Scariest Books of All Time at FlavorWire

Original Reddit stories
Footsteps 
Balloons
Boxes 
Maps
Screens
Friends

Self-published books
2012 American novels
2010s horror novels
American thriller novels
American horror novels
Creepypasta
Novels first published online
2012 debut novels